Madonna and Child with Four Saints or Madonna and Child with Saints John the Baptist, Paul, Mary Magdalene and Jerome is a  oil on panel painting by Titian, now in the Gemäldegalerie in Dresden. It belongs to the sacra conversazione genre and features saints John the Baptist, Paul, Mary Magdalene and Jerome.

In the past it has been attributed to several artists. Morelli was the first to assign it to Titian, as have most later art historians. No documents survive to assist in its dating, which is solely based on stylistic comparison to the free composition and rich colours of Titian's Assumption.

It was probably in cardinal Domenico Grimani's collection in Venice before moving to Santa Maria dei Servi church in Venice, then to Este family collection. In 1745 most of the Este collection was bought by the Duke of Saxony, bringing it to its present home.

References

1520 paintings
Paintings of Jerome
Paintings depicting Paul the Apostle
Paintings depicting Mary Magdalene
Paintings depicting John the Baptist
Paintings of the Madonna and Child by Titian
Collections of the Gemäldegalerie Alte Meister